Map of places in Shetland compiled from this list

The List of places in Shetland is a list for any island, town, village or hamlet in the Shetland Islands council area of Scotland.

Source: www.shetlopedia.com/Shetland_Settlements

A
Aith
Aithsetter
Aywick

B
Baliasta
Baltasound
Bardister
Basta
Belmont
Benston
Biggings
Bigton
Billister
Bixter
Boddam
Brae
Braehoulland
Braewick
Braewick
Breakon
Brettabister
Bridge End
Bridge of Walls
Brindister
Brindister
Brough
Brough Lodge
Browland
Buness
Burnside
Burra Voe
Burrafirth
Burraland
Burrastow
Burravoe
Burwick
Busta

C
Caldback
Camb
Catfirth
Challister
Channerwick
Clivocast
Clothan
Clousta
Collafirth
Colvister
Copister
Cullivoe
Culswick
Cumlewick
Cunningsburgh
Cunnister
Cutts

D
Dale of Walls
Dalsetter
Delting
Dunrossness
Dury

E
East Burrafirth
East Hogaland
East Yell
Easter Quarff
Easter Skeld
Effirth
Eswick
Everton
Exnaboe

F
Firth
Fladdabister
Freester
Funzie

G
Garderhouse
Garth
Girlsta
Gletness
Gloup
Gluss
Gonfirth
Gossabrough
Gott
Graven
Greenbank
Grimister
Grindiscol
Grunasound
Gruting
Grutness
Gulberwick
Gunnista
Gunnister
Gutcher

H
Hadd
Haggersta
Haggrister
Ham
Hamnavoe
Haroldswick
Heglibister
Hellister
Heogan
Heylor
Hillock
Hillside
Hillswick
Hillwell
Holmsgarth
Hoswick
Houbie
Houlland (near Bixter)
Houlland (Sandwick)
Houlland (Scalloway)
Houlland (Yell)
Housetter
Houss
Houss Ness
Huxter

I
Ireland
Isbister
Islesburgh

K
Kettlester
Kirkabister

L
Laxfirth
Laxo 
Leebitton
Lerwick
Levenwick
Lund
Lunna
Lunning
Lunnister

M
Mail
Mangaster
Marrister
Maryfield
Maywick
Melby
Mid Yell
Mossbank
Murrister

N
Neap
Newgord
Nibon
Noness
Noonsbrough
Norby
North Collafirth
North Roe
North Sandwick
Northpunds
Norwick
Noss, Mainland Shetland
Isle of Noss

O
Ocraquoy
Oddsta
Ollaberry
Otterswick

P
Papil

Q
Quarff
Quendale
Quoys

R
Reawick
Rerwick
Roesound
Ronas Voe

S
Sand
Sandness
Sandsound
Sandwick (Mainland)
Sandwick (Whalsay)
Scalloway
Scarff
Scatness
Scatsta
Scousburgh
Selivoe
Sellafirth
Semblister
Setter
Silwick
Skarpigarth
Skaw
Skaw
Skelberry
Skeld
Skellister
Sound
South Collafirth
South Garth
South Scousburgh
South Whiteness
Southpunds
Stanydale
Starkigarth
Stebbligrind
Stenness
Stonganess
Stonybreck
Stove
Sudheim
Sullom
Sumburgh Head
Sweening
Symbister

T
Tangwick
Tingwall
Toab
Toft
Trebister
Tresta
Trondavoe
Turniebrae
Twatt

U
Ulsta
Underhoull
Unifirth
Uppersound
Uradale
Urafirth
Ure
Uyeasound

V
Vaivoe
Valsgarth
Vatsetter
Veensgarth
Vidlin
Virkie
Voe, village at head of Olna Firth
Voe, settlement on Northmavine peninsula

W
Wadbister
Wallacetown
Walls
Weisdale
West Burrafirth
West Heogaland
West Sandwick
West Yell
Wester Quarff
Wester Skeld
Westerfield
Westerwick
Westing
Wethersta
Whiteness

Z
Zoar

See also
List of places in Scotland
List of islands of Scotland
List of Shetland islands

Geography of Shetland
Shetland
Places